Diana is an outdoor 1898 bronze sculpture of Diana by Reinhold Felderhoff, cast in 1910 and installed in the Kolonnadenhof outside the Alte Nationalgalerie in Berlin, Germany.

See also

 1898 in art

References

External links
 

1898 establishments in Germany
1898 sculptures
Bronze sculptures in Germany
Diana (mythology)
Nude sculptures in Germany
Sculptures of Artemis
Sculptures of women in Germany
Statues in Germany